Gjertsen is a Norwegian surname. Notable people with the surname include:

Astrid Gjertsen (1928–2020), Norwegian politician 
Doug Gjertsen (born 1967), American swimmer 
Finn Gjertsen (born 1959), Norwegian artistic gymnast
Joey Gjertsen (born 1982), American soccer player
Lasse Gjertsen (born 1984), Norwegian animator, musician, and videographer
Torgil Øwre Gjertsen (born 1992), Norwegian footballer

See also
Randi Bakke-Gjertsen (1904–1984), Norwegian pair skater
Mount Gjertsen, a mountain of Marie Byrd Land, Antarctica
Gjertsen Promontory, a promontory of Marie Byrd Land, Antarctica

Norwegian-language surnames